Mohabbat Aur Jung was a 1998 Hindi action drama film directed by Hameed Alam.

Plot 
The central character is a boy who fights against the local gangsters selling drugs in his college. One day the principal is killed and the blame goes on him. The police inspector turns out to be the principal's son who has vowed to avenge the life of his mother.

Cast 
 Deepak Tijori as Police Inspector Karan
 Kamal Sadanah as Vicky
 Mohnish Bahl as Bobby
 Bharat Kapoor as Dhanraj
 Rakesh Bedi as Saajan
 Kanchan as Bijli
 Neelam Kothari as Priya
 Mohan Joshi as chotu lal
 Dinesh Hingoo as Havaldar Vithoba
 Mushtaq Khan as Bheema
Rohini Hattangadi as Pratima

Soundtrack
"Dekho Dekho Kauva Chala Hai Hans Ki Chal" - Bali Brahmbhatt, Sudesh Bhosle
"Dil Leke Haathon Me" - Kumar Sanu, Alka Yagnik
"Pyaar Hi Pyaar Hai" - Udit Narayan, Kavita Krishnamurthy
"Tukai Tukai (Tune Ye Kya Jaadu Kiya)" - Abhijeet, Poornima

References

External links 
 

1998 films
1990s Hindi-language films
1998 drama films
Films scored by Dilip Sen-Sameer Sen
Indian action drama films